The 2019 Chinese FA Women's Cup is the 13th edition of the Chinese FA Women's Cup. Jiangsu Suning are the defending champions. It is held from 16 March to 22 June 2019.

First round

Second round

Quarter-finals

Semi-finals

1st Leg

2nd Leg

Finals

1st Leg

2nd Leg

References

2019 in Chinese football